The Howland Hook Marine Terminal, operating as ‘’’GCT New York,’’’ is a container port facility in the Port of New York and New Jersey located at Howland Hook in northwestern Staten Island, New York City. It is situated on the east side of the Arthur Kill, at the entrance to Newark Bay, just north of the Goethals Bridge and Arthur Kill Vertical Lift Bridge.

Built by American Export Lines, the site originally housed a B & O coal dumper, which was completed in 1949. The facility had a capacity of 100 cars per eight-hour shift. The dumped coal was delivered via barge to utilities in the harbor. It was in the process of being dismantled by Summer 1965. The terminal was purchased in 1973 by New York City for $47.5 million.  In 1985, the Port Authority of New York and New Jersey leased the terminal from the city for a period of 38 years. The Port Authority of New York and New Jersey currently contracts Global Container to operate a container terminal on the site.  

Facilities include container storage, a deep-freeze refrigerated warehouse and United States Customs Service inspection.

The facility is also used to transfer containerized municipal waste from barges to trains, handling roughly half of New York City's barged trash volume.

The terminal includes an on-site seven-track ExpressRail  intermodal facility  that connects via the Arthur Kill Vertical Lift Bridge to New Jersey and the national rail network. Two tracks are used for transferring waste containers. The rail facility opened in mid-2007 and uses part of the once-abandoned North Shore Branch of the Staten Island Railway, which leads into the Arlington Yard, and the Travis branch, along the West Shore.'''

See also

Port Jersey Marine Terminal
Port Newark-Elizabeth Marine Terminal
Red Hook Marine Terminal
Geography of New York-New Jersey Harbor Estuary

References

External links

Port Authority site on Howland Hook
New York Container Terminal, Inc.

Transportation buildings and structures in Staten Island
Port Authority of New York and New Jersey
Ports and harbors of New York (state)
Container terminals
Staten Island Railway
Rail freight transportation in New York City
Port of New York and New Jersey